Otsamo fell (Otsamotunturi in Finnish) is located in Inari, Finland. There is a cabin on top of the fell that is free to use for hikers.

Otsamo fell is popular hiking destination in Inari. A  trekking path leads from Siida, Inari to Otsamo fell.

External links 
 Outdoors.fi - Sights in Inari Hiking Area
 Outdoors.fi - Otsamo day trip hut

References 

Mountains of Finland